Kepteni (Kepteni) is a rural locality (a selo) and the administrative center of Legyoysky Rural Okrug of Ust-Aldansky District in the Sakha Republic, Russia, located  from Borogontsy, the administrative center of the district. Its population as of the 2010 Census was 1,081; up from 1,070 recorded in the 2002 Census.

References

Notes

Sources
Official website of the Sakha Republic. Registry of the Administrative-Territorial Divisions of the Sakha Republic. Ust-Aldansky District. 

Rural localities in Ust-Aldansky District